Bebearia eliensis, the pinkish forester, is a butterfly in the family Nymphalidae. It is found in Nigeria, Cameroon, Gabon, the Republic of the Congo, the Central African Republic and Democratic Republic of the Congo. The habitat consists of wetter forests.

Adults feed on fallen fruit.

Subspecies
Bebearia eliensis eliensis (southern Cameroon, Gabon, Congo, Central African Republic, Democratic Republic of the Congo: Cataractes and Equateur)
Bebearia eliensis scrutata Hecq, 1989 (Nigeria, western Cameroon)
Bebearia eliensis unita (Capronnier, 1889) (Democratic Republic of the Congo: central basin)

References

Butterflies described in 1866
eliensis
Butterflies of Africa
Taxa named by William Chapman Hewitson